The first season of Sunt celebru, scoate-mă de aici! was broadcast on Pro TV from 16 February 2015 to 8 March 2015. The show has been hosted by Cabral Ibacka and Mihai Bobonete and it was filmed at the Kruger National Park in South Africa.

Contestants
The show began with 10 celebrity contestants. Then 3 more came: Alina Plugaru and Gabi Jugaru on Day 3 and Vladimir Drăghia on Day 7.

Results and elimination
 Indicates that the celebrity was immune from the vote
 Indicates that the celebrity received the most votes from the public
 Indicates that the celebrity received the fewest votes and was eliminated immediately (no bottom two)
 Indicates that the celebrity was named as being in the bottom 2, or bottom 3

Summary

Week 1 (Day 1 - Day 7)

Week 2 (Day 8 - Day 14)

Week 3 (Day 15 - Day 21)

Tucker trials
The contestants take part in daily trials to earn food. These trials aim to test both physical and mental abilities. The winner is usually determined by the number of stars collected during the trial, with each star representing a meal earned by the winning contestant for their camp mates.

 The public voted for who they wanted to face the trial
 The contestants decided who did which trial
 The trial was compulsory and neither the public or celebrities decided who took part

Notes
 Mihai and Andreea win the stars at the trial, but after an incident with Dorian, who strained sugar in his knapsack, the celebrities have not received anything, because of policy set by the producers.
 Elena M. did not participate in the challenge because of her age.
 Elena M. was ruled out of this trial due to medical reasons
 Cătălin and Elena M. were excluded from this trial on medical grounds.
 Cătălin, Elena M. and Luminița were excluded from this trial on medical grounds.

Star count

Celebrity Chest challenges
Two or more celebrities are chosen to take part in the "Celebrity Chest" challenge to win luxuries for camp. Each challenge involves completing a task to win a chest to take back to camp. However, to win the luxury item in the chest, the campmates must correctly answer a question. If they fail to answer correctly, the luxury item is forfeited and a joke prize is won.

 The celebrities got the question correct
 The celebrities got the question wrong

Statistics

The Camp
For the show, celebrities live in jungle conditions in Kruger National Park, South Africa, with few creature comforts.

Ratings
Official ratings are taken from ARMA (Asociaţia Română pentru Măsurarea Audienţelor), the organisation that compiles audience measurement and television ratings in Romania.

References

I'm a Celebrity...Get Me Out of Here!
2015 Romanian television seasons